"Kentucky Rain" is a 1970 song written by Eddie Rabbitt and Dick Heard and recorded by Elvis Presley. It was recorded at American Sound Studio and features then session pianist Ronnie Milsap. Other musicians on the record include Bobby Wood on piano, Bobby Emmons on organ, Reggie Young on guitar, Tommy Cogbill on bass and Gene Chrisman on drums. The song and session was produced by Felton Jarvis (RCA-Victor) and Chips Moman (American Sound Studio of Memphis).  It was certified Gold by the RIAA, signifying United States sales of more than a million copies.

Background
"Kentucky Rain" was first recorded by Elvis Presley. The single peaked at #16 on the Billboard pop singles chart.  Released as a single on January 29, 1970, featuring "My Little Friend" as the B side, "Kentucky Rain" was one of the decade's first hits for Presley. Its first appearance on an album was in the August 1970 compilation package Worldwide 50 Gold Award Hits Vol. 1 (LPM-6401). While the track does appear on the 2000 rerelease of From Elvis in Memphis, it was not included on the original 1969 album. During Presley's February 1970 engagement, he performed it some sixteen times, introducing it as a new song "out about a week."  Live versions are available on the box sets Elvis Aaron Presley and Live in Las Vegas.

The song is included on the CD Elvis with the Royal Philharmonic Orchestra: The Wonder of You (2016).

It was published by Elvis Presley Music, Inc. and S-P-R Music Corporation.

The lyrics tell the story of an anxious lover as he walks and hitchhikes through the "cold Kentucky rain" in search of his missing love. The single was certified Gold by the RIAA in March, 1992.

Charts
The single peaked at #12 on the Cash Box Top 100 and #16 on the Billboard Hot 100.  It also reached #6 in Canada, #21 in the UK, and #7 in Australia.

Chart performance

Cover versions
Songwriter Eddie Rabbitt released his own version of the song in 1978 for his, Variations LP.

References

1970s ballads
Elvis Presley songs
RCA Records singles
1970 singles
Songs written by Eddie Rabbitt
Song recordings produced by Chips Moman
Songs about Kentucky
Country ballads